Giannis Stoforidis (Greek: Γιάννης Στοφοριδης; born 8 May 1989) is a Greek kickboxer currently fighting in ONE Championship. He has also fought in the SUPERKOMBAT Fighting Championship, Glory, Enfusion and OSS Fighters.

Kickboxing career

SuperKombat
In 2013, Stoforidis entered the SUPERKOMBAT World Grand Prix after impressing in the SuperKombat New Heroes. Previously, he has won the SUPERKOMBAT Tryouts (heavyweight division) in Athens, Greece on January 26, 2013. Finally, he qualified for the SUPERKOMBAT World Grand Prix 2013 Final Elimination.

Stoforidis beat Mathieu Kongolo by third round TKO at the SUPERKOMBAT World Grand Prix 2013 Final Elimination in Ploiești, Romania on November 9, 2013.

He competed in the SUPERKOMBAT World Grand Prix 2013 Final in Galați, Romania on December 21, 2013, losing to Redouan Cairo via TKO due to a broken hand in the semi-finals.

Glory
Stoforidis was scheduled to face Anderson Silva at Glory 41: Holland in the semi-finals of the 2017 Glory Heavyweight Contender Tournament on May 20, 2017. He lost by KO in the second round.

ONE Championship 
Stoforidis made his ONE Championship debut against Beybulat Isaev at ONE: Heavy Hitters on January 14, 2022. He won by first-round knockout 31 seconds into the first round.  

Stoforidis faced Andrei Stoica at ONE 156 on April 22, 2022. After getting knocked down in the second round, Stoforidis lost by majority decision.  

Stoforidis was booked to face Rade Opačić at ONE on Prime Video 2 on September 30, 2022, in the ONE heavyweight Grand Prix alternate bout. He lost the fight by a second-round knockout.

Personal Life 
Stroforidis was born in May 8, 1989.

During his boxing course, Stroforidis has trained and developed a friendship with former Greek strongman and weightlifter Kyriakos Kapakoulakidis.

Championships and awards

Boxing
2011 National Champion of Greece

Kickboxing
Enfusion
Enfusion Live Heavyweight Tournament Champion (2019)
SUPERKOMBAT Fighting Championship 
SUPERKOMBAT World Grand Prix Runner-up (2013)
No Limits
No Limits Heavyweight Championship (Two times, 2011 & 2012)

Kickboxing record

|-  style="background:#fbb;"
| 2022-10-01 || Loss ||align=left| Rade Opačić || ONE on Prime Video 2 || Kallang, Singapore || KO (Punches) || 2  || 1:52 
|-  style="background:#fbb;"
| 2022-04-22|| Loss ||align=left|  Andrei Stoica || ONE 158 || Kallang, Singapore|| Decision (Majority) || 3 || 3:00 
|-  style="background:#cfc;"
| 2022-01-14 || Win ||align=left| Beybulat Isaev || ONE: Heavy Hitters || Singapore ||KO (Left Hook)|| 1||0:31
|-  bgcolor="#CCFFCC"
| 2020-02-07 || Win ||align=left|  Enver Šljivar || OSS Fighters 05, Quarter Finals || Bucharest, Romania || TKO (referee stoppage) || 3 || 1:02
|-
|- style="background:#fbb;"
| 2019-12-06 || Loss ||align=left| Levi Rigters || Enfusion 92, Semi Final  || Abu Dhabi, United Arab Emirates ||Decision (Unanimous) || 3 || 3:00
|-  bgcolor="#CCFFCC"
| 2019-05-04 || Win ||align=left|  Houari Zeghad || Enfusion Live 84, Final || Darmstadt, Germany || KO (Punch) || 1 || 2:25
|-
|-  bgcolor="#CCFFCC"
| 2019-05-04 || Win ||align=left|  Andre Schmeling || Enfusion Live 84, Semi Final || Darmstadt, Germany || Decision (Unanimous) || 3 || 3:00 
|-
|-  bgcolor="#CCFFCC"
| 2017-10-07 || Win ||align=left|  Vladimir Tok || Enfusion Live 54 || Ludwigsburg, Germany || Decision (Unanimous) || 3 || 3:00 
|-
|-  bgcolor="#FFBBBB"
| 2017-05-20 || Loss ||align=left|  Anderson Silva|| Glory 41: Holland, Semi Final|| Den Bosch, Netherlands || TKO (punches) || 2 || 2:26
|-
|-  bgcolor="#CCFFCC"
| 2017-03-22 || Win ||align=left|  Andrei Ohotnik || Tatneft Cup 2017 - 1st selection 1/8 final|| Kazan, Russia || KO (straight left)|| 1 || 
|-
|-  bgcolor="#CCFFCC"
| 2015-06-07 || Win ||align=left|  Radovan Kulla || Colosseum Fight Show|| Thessaloniki, Greece || KO || 1 || 
|-
|-  bgcolor="#CCFFCC"
| 2015-02-21 || Win ||align=left|  Giorgos Mavrogiannis || Best Fighter || Greece || KO || 2 || 
|-
|-  bgcolor="#CCFFCC"
| 2015-02-07 || Win ||align=left|  Miroslav Vujović || Scorpion 8  || Thessaloniki, Greece || KO || 2 || 
|-
|-  bgcolor="#FFBBBB"
| 2014-03-07 || Loss ||align=left|   Cătălin Moroșanu || SUPERKOMBAT New Heroes 8 || Constanța, Romania || KO (Left Hook) || 2 || 2:26
|-  bgcolor="#FFBBBB"
| 2014-03-07 || Loss ||align=left|  Bahadir Sari || AKIN Dövüş Arenası KickBoxing Event || Bakırköy, Turkey || Decision   || 3 || 3:00
|-  bgcolor="#FFBBBB"
| 2013-12-21 || Loss ||align=left|  Redouan Cairo || SUPERKOMBAT World Grand Prix 2013 Final, Semi Finals || Galați, Romania || TKO (Hand Injury) || 2 ||
|-  bgcolor="#CCFFCC"
| 2013-11-30 || Win ||align=left|  Antonis Tzoros || Best Fighter  || Greece || DQ || 1 || 
|-  bgcolor="#CCFFCC"
| 2013-11-09 || Win ||align=left|  Mathieu Kongolo || SUPERKOMBAT World Grand Prix 2013 Final Elimination, Quarter Finals || Ploiești, Romania || TKO (Referee Stoppage) || 3 ||  2:58
|-
! style=background:white colspan=9 |
|-
|-  bgcolor="#FFBBBB"
| 2013-09-28 || Loss ||align=left|  D'Angelo Marshall || SUPERKOMBAT World Grand Prix III 2013, Final || Botoșani, Romania || TKO (Referee Stoppage) || 3 || 0:26
|-
! style=background:white colspan=9 |
|-
|-  bgcolor="#CCFFCC"
| 2013-09-28 || Win ||align=left|  Leroy Johnson || SUPERKOMBAT World Grand Prix III 2013, Semi Finals || Botoșani, Romania || TKO (Referee Stoppage) || 2 || 2:26 
|-
|-  bgcolor="#CCFFCC"
| 2013-04-26 || Win ||align=left|  Dorin Robert || Old School Fighting || Kavala, Greece || Decision (Unanimous) || 3 || 3:00 
|-
|-  bgcolor="#CCFFCC"
| 2012-12-01 || Win ||align=left|  Antonis Tzoros || No Limits 20 || Patras, Greece || TKO (Referee Stoppage) || 2 || 2:20 
|-
! style=background:white colspan=9 |
|-
|-  bgcolor="#CCFFCC"
| 2013-07-27 || Win ||align=left| Karl Glischynski || Fight Night || Kiel, Germany || TKO (Towel Thrown) || 2 || 0:32 
|-
|-  bgcolor="#CCFFCC"
| 2013-06-02 || Win ||align=left|  Antonis Tzoros || KIMBO 1 || Marousi, Greece || Decision (Unanimous) || 3 || 3:00 
|-
|-  bgcolor="#CCFFCC"
| 2012 || Win ||align=left| || No Limits 18 || Greece || KO (Left High Kick) || 1 || 1:29
|-
|-
| colspan=9 | Legend:

See also 
List of male kickboxers

References

1989 births
Living people
Heavyweight boxers
Greek male kickboxers
Heavyweight kickboxers
Greek male boxers
Glory kickboxers
SUPERKOMBAT kickboxers
ONE Championship kickboxers